Anthony DeSantis, KStJ (January 5, 1914 - June 6, 2007) was an American entrepreneur and theater owner in Chicago, Illinois. He is most well known for the foundation of the area's Drury Lane theatres.  During DeSantis' lifetime, his empire included six separate theaters.

Life and career
DeSantis was born in Gary, Indiana, and began his career in show business as a trumpet player in Chicago. In 1935, he was nearly killed in an explosion at the Glidden paint factory where he was working. In 1940, he purchased a club on Michigan Avenue before moving out of Chicago to nearby Evergreen Park, where he opened the Martinique Restaurant, which was highly acclaimed. He began producing plays in 1949 in a tent adjacent to the restaurant to attract customers. The enterprise was successful, prompting him to build his first theatre.

Drury Lane Theaters
The DeSantis theatres were named after the historic Theatre Royal Drury Lane, built in London in the 17th century. His five suburban Chicago locations all provided affordable dinner theatre that was appropriate for families. DeSantis claimed that alcohol sales were profitable; if you broke even when operating a theatre, you were successful.  
 
Drury Lane Evergreen Park was DeSantis' first theatre in the Chicago area. It opened in 1958 and was a local entertainment landmark for 45 years before closing in 2003.
Drury Lane Oak Brook Terrace opened in 1984, and it benefited from what DeSantis had learned over the years. The facility uses local performers to keep costs down; the theatre is surrounded by bars, restaurants and banquet rooms; shows are limited to musicals; and there is no charge for parking.
The original Drury Lane Water Tower Place opened in 1976, but closed in 1983. A new, $7 million version opened on May 18, 2004. In 2010, this was taken over by the Nederlander Organization-owned Broadway In Chicago production company and renamed the Broadway Playhouse at Water Tower Place. 
Drury Lane North began operations in 1976, but was soon sold to the Marriott Lincolnshire Resort and became the Marriott Theatre.
Drury Lane East (at McCormick Place) also opened in the 1970s, but failed within a year of its opening.

Despite the occasional setback, his Drury Lane Theater empire grew steadily and DeSantis became a wealthy man. He was opposed to Chicago mafia involvement in Chicago show business and in 1958 was involved in an FBI sting against the Chicago mob. This led to a retaliatory explosion in his Martinique nightclub in 1962. In reflecting on his life in 2005, DeSantis said:
"I suppose I could sit on a bench and drink martinis with a starlet on each arm. Nah. I work hard because I am just trying to keep alive."

Honors and awards
In 1971, DeSantis was made an associate Officer of the Venerable Order of Saint John. This was followed in 1980 by a promotion to the rank of associate knight in the same Order. DeSantis was a very generous supporter of Roman Catholic charities in Chicago. Tony DeSantis died on 6 June 2007 at age 93 and his funeral mass was said at Holy Name Cathedral on 18 June 2007.

Post Tony
Tony's grandson, Kyle DeSantis, took over as President of Drury Lane Theatre in Oak Brook Terrace and Water Tower Place following Tony's death. In 2010, Drury Lane Water Tower Place was taken over by Broadway in Chicago. Significant increases to production budgets has allowed Drury Lane Theatre in Oak Brook Terrace to modernize the look of the stage, enhance scenic design, add more players to the orchestra pit, secure better costuming, and cast with, as Chris Jones of the Chicago Tribune said, “a real eye to excellence,” drawing from both “the very talented, vibrant Chicago theater community” and “a national casting pool.” In 2013, the facility unveiled phase I of its multimillion-dollar renovation, including the 27,000 square foot Grand Ballroom, the Main Lobby and Cocktail Lounge, and the French and English Rooms. Phase 2 will include the renovation of the Courtyard Restaurant and the Theatre Bar.

References

External links
Drury Lane Oakbrook
Drury Lane Watertower Place

1914 births
2007 deaths
American people of Italian descent
American theatre managers and producers
Knights of the Order of St John
People from Gary, Indiana
Businesspeople from Chicago
People from Oak Brook, Illinois
Catholics from Illinois
Catholics from Indiana
20th-century American businesspeople